Uzbekistan competed at the 2012 Summer Paralympics in London, United Kingdom from August 29 to September 9, 2012.

Medallists

Athletics 

Men's Field Events

Women's Track and Road Events

Judo

Powerlifting 

Men

Women

Swimming

Men

See also

 Uzbekistan at the 2012 Summer Olympics

References

Nations at the 2012 Summer Paralympics
2012
2012 in Uzbekistani sport